The 1996-97 Azerbaijan Top League was contested by 16 teams and won by Neftchi Baku. Champions are Garabag Agdam thanks to "youth points" from the U-15 and 
U-16 Championships.

Teams

Stadia and locations

1Qarabağ played their home matches at Surakhani Stadium in Baku before moving to their current stadium on 3 May 2009.

League table

Results

Season statistics

Top scorers

References

External links
Azerbaijan 1996-97 RSSSF
APL Stats

Azerbaijan Premier League seasons
Azer
1996–97 in Azerbaijani football